Angelo Broglio da Lavello, known as Angelo Tartaglia (1350 or 1370–1421), was an Italian condottiero and nobleman, captain of the Papal Army, lord of Lavello and Toscanella.

Biography
Born in Lavello, Basilicata, Tartaglia trained at the military school of Ceccolo Broglia and served the Republic of Florence. On 26 June 1402, he fought in the Battle of Casalecchio; he was charged with overseeing the bridge of Reno, but he left his position to participate in the combat, leaving the camps without any defense on his side. His imprudence cost the defeat of his army, and Tartaglia was captured and imprisoned. 

Released, he assumed responsibility for the defeat, but not enough to appease the wrath of Muzio Attendolo Sforza. Relations between Tartaglia and Sforza became bad, resulting in a strong rivalry. In 1409, he fought in the service of Ladislaus of Naples, defending Perugia and Civitavecchia from the assaults of Braccio da Montone and conquering Rome, scaring away the antipope John XXIII.

As a token of gratitude, Ladislaus gave him the title of Lord of Toscanella in 1413. In 1418, he swore allegiance to Pope Martin V and occupied Assisi one year later and other territories between Lazio and Umbria. Tartaglia was arrested while sleeping by his rival, Muzio Attendolo. After being tortured, he was decapitated at Aversa in 1421.

Bibliography
Antonio Di Chicco, Il condottiero Angelo Tartaglia di Lavello, nel primo Ventennio del sec. XV, Lavello, Tip. Finiguerra, 1957; nuova edizione TARSIA di Melfi, 1990.
Patrizia Chiatti, La biografia del condottiero Angelo Tartaglia (1370-1421), Edizioni Penne & Papiri, Tuscania, 2011.

Year of birth uncertain
1421 deaths
People from Lavello
15th-century condottieri
14th-century condottieri
Deaths by decapitation